Christian Ferdinand Andreas Mølsted (15 October 1862 – 10 May 1930) was a Danish artist who specialized in marine painting. He is best known for his painting of the frigate Niels Juel during the Battle of Heligoland on 9 May 1864.

Biography
Born in Dragør, he was the son of Andreas Adolf Nikolaj Mølsted, a fisherman, and Ane Hans-Nielsdatter. With financial support from a relative, he completed his education in Copenhagen at Det tekniske Selskab where he graduated in 1879. After sailing to Madeira that summer on the frigate Jylland, he entered the Danish Academy in October 1880, under the tutelage of Frederik Vermehren, Jorgen Roed, Julius Exner and Carl Bloch. During his studies, he travelled to Paris and London where he was able to observe the trends in contemporary art. His first showing came in 1884 and he continued to be a regular participant in the Charlottenborg Spring Exhibition.

He graduated from the Academy in January 1885, set out to become a marine painter and received instruction from two local self-taught artists in Dragør, Commander Peder Foss (1821-1882) and the pilot, Hendrik Strømberg (1840-1916). His subjects are for the most part taken from the coasts around Copenhagen or in Jutland.

Among the artist’s favorite subjects were the heroic battles of captains Peter Tordenskjold and Peter Willemoes. Historical details, as well as detailed information about the ships, was provided for the paintings by Otto Dorge, a local expert in Dragør. Later in life, he also created genre paintings. Mølsted's works were widely appreciated for his perfectionist approach, his attention to historical detail and his ability to bring things to life.

He died on 10 May 1930 in Dragør and is buried in the cemetery at Dragør Church.
 His studio in Dragør now serves as a museum of his works. The display contains a wide range of his artwork from his marine paintings to local subjects.

Selected works
En engelsk Brig erobres af danske Kanonbaade (1887)
Peder Bredals Skibe ises ud af Nyborg-Fjord (1891)
Om Bord i Fregatten Niels Juel, under Kampen ved Helgoland den 9. Maj 1864 (1898)
Slaget paa Reden; Willemoes om Bord i det Gernerske Flaadebatteri (1901)
Willemoes' Død om Bord i Linieskibet Prinds Christian Frederik, under Kampen ved Sjællands Odde (1906)
Aalefiskere; Efleraarsstemning i Drogden (1908)
Solopgang i Drogden (1909)
Tordenskjolds Landgang i Marstrand (1910).

Gallery

References

External links

1862 births
1930 deaths
People from Dragør Municipality
Danish marine artists
Royal Danish Academy of Fine Arts alumni
19th-century Danish painters
Danish male painters
20th-century Danish painters
19th-century Danish male artists
20th-century Danish male artists